Rowland Denys Guy Winn, 4th Baron St Oswald,  (19 September 1916 – 19 December 1984), was a British soldier and Conservative politician.

Biography
St Oswald was the eldest son of Rowland George Winn, 3rd Baron St Oswald, and his wife Eve Carew, daughter of Charles Greene. He was a major in the 8th King's Royal Irish Hussars and served in the Middle East from 1940 to 1944 and South-East Asia from 1944 to 1945 in the Second World War, where he was wounded and mentioned in dispatches. He later fought in the Korean War from 1950 to 1952 where he was awarded the Military Cross (MC).

St Oswald succeeded his father in the barony in 1957 and took his seat on the Conservative benches in the House of Lords. He served under Harold Macmillan and Sir Alec Douglas-Home as a Lord-in-waiting (government whip in the House of Lords) from 1959 to 1962 and as Joint Parliamentary Secretary to the Ministry of Agriculture, Fisheries and Food from 1962 to 1964. From 1973 to 1979 he was an appointed Member of the European Parliament (MEP).  He contested the Yorkshire West constituency at the first direct elections to the Parliament, in 1979, but was unsuccessful.

He was also a deputy lieutenant (DL) of the West Riding of Yorkshire and of the City of York.

Lord St Oswald married firstly Laurian, daughter of Sir Roderick Jones, in 1952. They were divorced in 1955. He married secondly Maria Wanda, daughter of Sigismund Jaxa-Chamiec, in 1955. She died in 1981. Lord St Oswald survived her by three years and died in December 1984, aged 68. He was succeeded in the barony by his younger brother, Derek Winn.

See also
Sophie Moss

Notes

References
Kidd, Charles, Williamson, David (editors). Debrett's Peerage and Baronetage (1990 edition). New York: St Martin's Press, 1990, 

1916 births
1984 deaths
Barons in the Peerage of the United Kingdom
8th King's Royal Irish Hussars officers
British Army personnel of World War II
Recipients of the Military Cross
Deputy Lieutenants of the West Riding of Yorkshire
British Army personnel of the Korean War
Conservative Party (UK) MEPs
MEPs for the United Kingdom 1973–1979
Ministers in the Macmillan and Douglas-Home governments, 1957–1964